The Lancea was a javelin used in ancient Rome. According to the OED, the word originally came from the Celtiberian language, also cf. λόγχη (lonche), the Greek term for lance. One kind of lancea, possibly known as the lancea pugnatoria or "the fighting lance" was used as a thrusting weapon by cavalrymen. This weapon was used by cavalrymen as it was lighter and easier to use than the pilum. The lancea was also used by auxiliaries. legionaries would use the lancea if the occasion called for it. Arrian equipped his army with the weapon during a battle with the Alans. Soldiers that used it were known as lancearii. It is unclear how the lancea was distinguished from the hastae. Many lancea had amenta, although not all. This kind of javelin also had short wooden shafts and small leaf-shaped metal heads. Sometimes the heads had elongated points which may have been used to increase the penetration of the spear.

References

Bibliography 
 
 
 
 
 
 
 
 
 
 
 
 
 
 

Personal weapons
Ancient weapons
Throwing spears
Ancient Roman legionary equipment
Roman spears
Projectiles

See also
Pole weapon
Pilum
Verutum
Spiculum
Roman military personal equipment